Round Hill Historic District is a national historic district located at Round Hill, Loudoun County, Virginia.  It encompasses 204 contributing buildings, 1 contributing site, and 1 contributing structure in the town of Round Hill.  It includes a variety of residential, commercial, and institutional buildings, with the majority built between 1880 and 1920. Notable buildings include the Gregg-Parks-Potts House (c. 1775), Guilford Gregg Store (c. 1851), Sagamore Hall, James Copeland House (1886), Hibbs House (c. 1890), African Methodist Church (1892), Mount Zion Baptist Church, Round Hill Baptist Church, Round Hill United Methodist Church, Castle Hall, Ford's Store, Round Hill Grocery, and the former Round Hill Railroad Depot (1902).

It was listed on the National Register of Historic Places in 2009.

References

Historic districts in Loudoun County, Virginia
Victorian architecture in Virginia
National Register of Historic Places in Loudoun County, Virginia
Historic districts on the National Register of Historic Places in Virginia